In music, Op. 27 stands for Opus number 27. Compositions that are assigned this number include:

 Alkan – Le chemin de fer
 Arnold – English Dances
 Atterberg – Sonata in B minor
 Beethoven – Piano Sonata No. 13
 Beethoven – Piano Sonata No. 14
 Britten – Hymn to St Cecilia
 Castelnuovo – Naomi and Ruth
 Chopin – Nocturnes, Op. 27
 Elgar – From the Bavarian Highlands
 Elgar – Three Bavarian Dances
 Enescu – Orchestral Suite No. 3
 Grieg – String Quartet No. 1
 Klebe – Die tödlichen Wünsche
 Lover – Heimliche Aufforderung
 Mendelssohn – Calm Sea and Prosperous Voyage
 Nielsen – Symphony No. 3
 Rachmaninoff – Symphony No. 2
 Reger – Ein' feste Burg ist unser Gott
 Roussel – Joueurs de flûte
 Schumann – Lieder und Gesänge volume I (5 songs)
 Shostakovich – The Bolt
 Sibelius – King Christian II
 Spohr – String Quartet No. 6
 Strauss – Cäcilie
 Strauss – Morgen!
 Strauss – Ruhe, meine Seele!
 Suk – Asrael Symphony
 Szymanowski – Symphony No. 3
 Waterhouse – Cello Concerto
 Webern – Variations for piano
 Ysaÿe – Six Sonatas for solo violin
 Violin Sonata No. 2